Johan Häggström (born 10 March 1992) is a Swedish cross-country skier who represents the club Piteå Elit.

Cross-country skiing results
All results are sourced from the International Ski Federation (FIS).

Olympic Games

Distance reduced to 30 km due to weather conditions.

World Championships

World Cup

Season standings

Individual podiums
 1 podium – (1 )

Team podiums
 3 podiums – (1 ,  2 )

References 

1992 births
Living people
Swedish male cross-country skiers
Tour de Ski skiers
Cross-country skiers at the 2022 Winter Olympics
Olympic cross-country skiers of Sweden